Jim Spooner Field is a stadium in Pensacola, Florida, United States that is primarily used for baseball, and is home field for the University of West Florida baseball team and was home to the Pensacola Pelicans. It opened in 1981 with a seating capacity of about 1,000 people. Over the years, that capacity has more than tripled.

In May 2003, the stadium underwent a massive renovation. The president of the Pelicans, Rishy Studer, and her husband Quint, contributed $500,000 to improve the stadium to meet minor league standards. The renovations included adding a lawn seating area that could accommodate up to 500 people, a series of premium seating sections, a public address system, a new backstop, and accommodations for the disabled.  On August 22, 2008, the Pelicans organization named it after Jim Spooner, a long time UWF coach.  The first game at Jim Spooner Field at Pelican Park was played that night.

Notes

Minor league baseball venues
Sports venues in Pensacola, Florida
Baseball venues in Florida
West Florida Argonauts baseball
Sports venues completed in 1981
1981 establishments in Florida